Safiabad (also Romanized as Şafīābād; also known as Sa‘īdābād and Seyfīābād) is a village in Ziarat Rural District, in the Central District of Dashtestan County, Bushehr Province, Iran. At the 2006 census, its population was 90, in 19 families.

References 

Populated places in Dashtestan County